The 1998 season was São Paulo's 69th season since club's existence.

Statistics

Scorers

Overall

{|class="wikitable"
|-
|Games played || 60 (6 Copa do Brasil, 10 Torneio Rio-São Paulo, 14 Campeonato Paulista, 23 Campeonato Brasileiro, 6 Copa Mercosur, 1 Friendly match)
|-
|Games won || 26 (3 Copa do Brasil, 2 Torneio Rio-São Paulo, 11 Campeonato Paulista, 8 Campeonato Brasileiro, 2 Copa Mercosur, 0 Friendly match)
|-
|Games drawn || 13 (2 Copa do Brasil, 5 Torneio Rio-São Paulo, 1 Campeonato Paulista, 3 Campeonato Brasileiro, 1 Copa Mercosur, 1 Friendly match)
|-
|Games lost || 21 (1 Copa do Brasil, 3 Torneio Rio-São Paulo, 2 Campeonato Paulista, 12 Campeonato Brasileiro, 3 Copa Mercosur, 0 Friendly match)
|-
|Goals scored || 109
|-
|Goals conceded || 83
|-
|Goal difference || +26
|-
|Best result || 6–1 (H) v São José - Campeonato Paulista - 1998.04.12  6–1 (H) v América-RN - Campeonato Brasileiro - 1998.08.26
|-
|Worst result || 2–7 (H) v Portuguesa - Campeonato Brasileiro - 1998.09.20
|-
|Most appearances || 
|-
|Top scorer || Dodô and França (23)
|-

Friendlies

Official competitions

Copa do Brasil

Record

Torneio Rio-São Paulo

Record

Campeonato Paulista

Record

Campeonato Brasileiro

Record

Copa Mercosur

Record

External links
official website 

Sao Paulo
São Paulo FC seasons